Timothy Simon Janman (born 9 September 1956) is a former Conservative Party politician in England. He was Member of Parliament (MP) for Thurrock in Essex from 1987 to 1992, when he lost to the Labour Party candidate Andrew Mackinlay.

Early years
Tim Janman was the son of Jack and Irene Janman, And had half brothers Clive and Rodger, and educated at the Sir William Borlase's Grammar School at Marlow, Buckinghamshire, and the University of Nottingham. He married, 29 September 1990, Shirley Buckingham née Silvey.  He worked as a personnel officer at the Ford Motor Company from 1979 to 1987.

Political activities

Janman was chairman of the Nottingham University Conservative Association 1976–1977, and was National Senior Vice-Chairman of the Federation of Conservative Students 1980–1981. He served as chairman of the Selsdon Group 1983–1987, later becoming a vice-president. In 1987, he served, briefly, as a member of Southampton City Council. In 1990, he became President of the London Swinton circle.

Janman was Vice-President of the Jordan is Palestine Committee, Joint Secretary of the Conservative backbench Employment Committee 1987–1988, Joint Vice-Chairman of same 1988–1992. He was a member of the Parliamentary Select Committee on Employment from 1989 to 1992, and Joint Secretary of the Conservative Backbench Home Affairs Committee, also from 1989 to 1992. Janman's special interests lay in the economy, privatisation, trade union reform, "law and order", and "immigration and resettlement".

Janman was a member of the Conservative Monday Club and was present at their South Africa Dinner, given for Andries Treurnicht on 5 June 1989.

On 10 October 1989, Janman joined Nicholas Budgen, MP, and Lord Moyne (in the chair) as speakers at a major fringe meeting organised by the Young Monday Club, heralded as "The End of the English? – Immigration and Repatriation". Janman was subsequently quoted by journalist Judy Jones in The Daily Telegraph as saying that: "if you look at the lack of immigration control in the past, then yes, Britain has become the dustbin of the world". He added that there was a need to offer voluntary repatriation to some members of ethnic minorities settled in the UK, which did not wish to integrate with the indigenous population.

References

 Dod's Parliamentary Companion 1991, 172nd edition, East Sussex,

External links 

Living people
1956 births
Councillors in Hampshire
Politics of Thurrock
Conservative Party (UK) MPs for English constituencies
UK MPs 1987–1992
People educated at Sir William Borlase's Grammar School